The Chinese Ambassador to Afghanistan is the official representative of the People's Republic of China to Afghanistan.

List of representatives

See also
Ambassadors of China

References

 
Afghanistan
China